was a town located in Kinosaki District, Hyōgo, Japan.

As of 2003, the town had an estimated population of 13,519 and a density of 98.49 persons per km2. The total area was 137.26 km2.

On April 1, 2005, Kasumi, along with the towns of Mikata and Muraoka (both from Mikata District), was merged to create the town of Kami (in Mikata District), and no longer exists as an independent municipality. The portion of Kami that was Kasumi is now known as Kasumi-ku, Kasumi Ward.

Geography

Climate

Popular culture
The popular visual novel and anime franchise Air was set in Kasumi.

Transportation

Train stations
 JR-West
 Sanin Main Line: Kasumi
 Sanin Main Line: Satsu
 Sanin Main Line: Shibayama
 Sanin Main Line: Yoroi
 Sanin Main Line: Amarube

Major roads
Route 178

Attractions

Historical Sites
 Daijyō-ji Temple
 Amarube Viaduct

Other
 Misaki lighthouse A lighthouse in the Japan's highest place.

References

External links
 Official website of Kami in Japanese
 Google map

Dissolved municipalities of Hyōgo Prefecture
Kami, Hyōgo (Mikata)